Nothing Sacred is an Australian thrash metal band formed in the 1980s.

History 
One of the earliest Australian bands to play thrash/speed metal, Nothing Sacred formed in Melbourne, Australia in 1983. Karl Lean, Sham, and Mick Burnham had previously played together in the band Heresy. After losing both of the band's guitarists in 1983, they recruited two new guitarists, aiming for a heavier and more aggressive sound. After much searching, Mark Wooley, and Richard "Buddy" Snape joined the band and several months of rehearsal and songwriting began in earnest. In late 1983 the band played its first gigs which were well received by Melbournes metal community. Encouraged by the enthusiastic response to live shows, and after recording a demo, they recorded their debut EP Deathwish at York Street studios in late 1984. Manufacturing issues led to the EP not being released until early 1985. Released independently, the EP sold modestly well, helped by the band playing a large number of shows around Australia, and resulted in the title track "Deathwish" becoming a classic of Australian metal. An LP was released in 1988, titled Let Us Prey. Despite the songwriting and musicianship on the album, Let Us Prey suffered from poor production quality in comparison to its predecessor.

Before disbanding in 1989, Nothing Sacred's lead guitarist Mark Woolley, bassist Karl Lean and drummer Sham contributed to Hobbs' Angel of Death's early work in the late 1980s. Woolley also appeared on Hobbs' first self-titled album in 1988. Vocalist Mick Burnham later joined short-lived Melbourne band Seizure in 1993.

Although their tenure was short-lived, Nothing Sacred still remains as an underground metal phenomenon in Australia. Songs from the Deathwish EP still get airplay on several Australian metal radio programmes from time to time.

Sacred performed a series 30th anniversary shows in 2012 that were very well received, with Ross Percy (Ion Drive, Little House Godz) joining George Larin on guitar that included a support slot with ex-Iron Maiden vocalist Paul Di'Anno. Despite the success, the band agreed not continue and returned to retirement.

In 2015, the band decided to re-activate with a lineup of Sham, Karl Lean, George Larin, Ross Percy and new vocalist Chris Stark. A slot on Melbourne's Brewtality Metal Festival received positive reviews before the band embarked on a short tour of Japan which inspired them to continue.

2021 the band released their first full length album NoGods making it a 35 year gap between releases. Ross Percy would be replaced my Stu Bedford on guitar and Chris Stark would be replaced by James Davies on vocals. 3 video's and singles were released prior to the albums release date on Rockshots Records. 

March 2023 the band was on a roll and would release the follow up to NoGods, A 6 track EP titled Leviathan. The EP would contain a mixture of new and old re recorded tracks stemming back to their early days.

Sound 
Although branded as a thrash metal group, Nothing Sacred's music had more of a melodic sound, at times reminiscent of Iron Maiden and Judas Priest. Vocalist Mick Burnham had a voice that sounded very similar to early Iron Maiden singer Paul Di'Anno, while current singer Chris Stark has often been likened to Bruce Dickinson and Judas Priest's Rob Halford.

Band members
Mick Burnham – vocals   1983–2012
Sham – drums            1983–present
Karl Lean – bass        1983–present
Richard Snape – guitar  1983–86
Mark Woolley – guitar   1983–86
George Larin – guitar   1986–87, 2012–present
Terry Cameron – guitar  1986–89
Richard Bubica – guitar 1987–89
Ross Percy – guitar  2012–present
Chris Stark – vocals  2015–present

Discography 
Deathwish (EP) (self-release, 1984)
Demo (1985)
Let Us Prey (album) (Cleopatra Records, 1988)
No Gods (album) (Rockshots, 2021)
Leviathan (album) (Rockshots, 2023)

External links 
 Nothing Sacred on Myspace

Australian thrash metal musical groups
Musical groups from Melbourne
Musical groups established in 1983
Musical groups disestablished in 1991
Musical quintets
Australian heavy metal musical groups